Neohoratia minuta is a species of very small freshwater snails that have an operculum, aquatic operculate gastropod mollusks in the family Hydrobiidae. This species is endemic to Switzerland.

References

Hydrobiidae
Endemic fauna of Switzerland
Gastropods described in 1805
Taxonomy articles created by Polbot